Columbus, Ohio has an extensive public art collection.

Works

 ART (1999), Columbus College of Art and Design
 Arvin J. Alexander Memorial (1991), Alexander AEP Park
 Breaker (1982), Ohio State University
 Celebration for a Champion (1984), Ohio State University
 Celebration of Life (2004), Genoa Park
 Charles Benton Flagg Memorial (c. 1901), Goodale Park
 Columbus Firefighters Memorial (1958), Battelle Riverfront Park
 Columbus Police Memorial (2000), Genoa Park
 Correlation: Two White Line Diagonals and Two Arcs with a Sixteen-Foot Radius (1978), Bricker Federal Building
 Dr. Samuel Mitchel Smith and Sons Memorial Fountain (1880), Wexner Medical Center
 The Family of Man: Figure 2, Ancestor II (1970), Columbus Museum of Art
 The Father of Columbus Baseball (2009), Huntington Park
 Flowing Kiss (2013), North Bank Park
 Freedom (1985), Battelle Riverfront Park
 Gavel (2008), Ohio Judicial Center
 Governor James A. Rhodes (1982), Rhodes State Office Tower
 Greenwood Park Sofa (2004), Cultural Arts Center
 James W. Barney Pickaweekee Story Grove (1992), Battelle Riverfront Park
 Hare on Ball and Claw (1990), Columbus Museum of Art
 Intermediate Model for the Arch (1975), Columbus Museum of Art
 Intersect (1992), Broad and High streets
 Lincoln Goodale Monument (1888), Goodale Park
 Naiads (1984), Capitol Square skyscraper
 Nationwide Fountain, One Nationwide Plaza
 NavStar '92 (1991), Franklin Park Conservatory
 The Newsboy (2018), 8 East Broad Street
 Out of There (1974), Columbus Museum of Art
 Oval with Points, Dorrian Commons Park
 Peter Pan (1927), Main Library
 Philo Unit 6 and Twin Branch Unit 4 (1983), AEP Building
 Scioto Lounge (2014), Genoa Park
 Spanish–American War Memorial (1937), Battelle Riverfront Park
 Statue of Arnold Schwarzenegger (2012), Greater Columbus Convention Center
 Statue of Benjamin Franklin (1974), Franklin County Hall of Justice
 Statue of Friedrich Schiller (1891), Schiller Park
 Statue of Lucas Sullivant (2000), Genoa Park
 Statue of William Oxley Thompson (1930), Ohio State University
 Their Spirits Circle the Earth (1987), Battelle Riverfront Park
 Three-Piece Reclining Figure: Draped 1975 (1975), Columbus Museum of Art
 To Honor the Immigrants (1992), Battelle Riverfront Park
 Two Lines Up Excentric Variation VI (1977), Columbus Museum of Art
 Umbrella Girl (1996), Schiller Park
 Union Station Arch (1899), McFerson Commons
 Untitled (Falsetti) (1960), Columbus City Schools Administration Office
 Wasahaban (1978), Columbus Museum of Art

Works at the Ohio Statehouse

 The Doughboy (1930)
 Lincoln Vicksburg Monument (1865-71)
 Ohio Holocaust and Liberators Memorial (2014)
 Ohio Veterans Plaza (1996)
 Peace (1922)
 The Spirit of '98 (1928)
 Statue of Christopher Columbus (1892)
 These Are My Jewels (1893)
 William McKinley Monument (1906)

Former works
 Statue of Christopher Columbus (1955), Columbus City Hall (no longer public)
 Statue of Christopher Columbus (1959), Columbus State Community College (no longer public)
 Union Station (1987)
 Trains (1989)

References

Public art in Columbus
Columbus, Ohio